The Thursday is a 1963 Italian comedy film directed by Dino Risi. It was shown as part of a retrospective on Italian comedy at the 67th Venice International Film Festival.

Cast
 Walter Chiari as Dino Versini
 Michèle Mercier as Elsa
 Roberto Ciccolini as Robertino
 Umberto D'Orsi as Rigoni
 Alice Kessler as herself
 Ellen Kessler as herself
 Silvio Bagolini as Doctor
 Emma Baron as Giulia
 Edy Biagetti
 Olimpia Cavalli as Olimpia
 Consalvo Dell'Arti as Concierge
 Margherita Horowitz as Kleptomaniac
 Salvo Libassi
 Liliana Maccalè (as Siliana Maccalè)

References

External links

1963 films
1963 comedy films
1960s Italian-language films
Italian black-and-white films
Films directed by Dino Risi
Commedia all'italiana
Films set in Rome
Films shot in Rome
1960s Italian films